Gmina Gostynin is a rural gmina (administrative district) in Gostynin County, Masovian Voivodeship, in east-central Poland. Its seat is the town of Gostynin, although the town is not part of the territory of the gmina.

The gmina contains part of the protected area called Gostynin-Włocławek Landscape Park.

Villages
Gmina Gostynin contains the villages and settlements of: 
 
 Aleksandrynów
 Anielin
 Antoninów
 Baby Dolne
 Baby Górne
 Belno
 Białe
 Białotarsk
 Bielawy
 Bierzewice
 Bolesławów
 Budy Kozickie
 Budy Lucieńskie
 Choinek
 Dąbrówka
 Emilianów
 Feliksów
 Gaśno
 Górki Drugie
 Górki Pierwsze
 Gorzewo
 Gulewo
 Halinów
 Helenów
 Huta Zaborowska
 Jaworek
 Józefków
 Kazimierzów
 Kiełpieniec
 Kleniew
 Klusek
 Kozice
 Krzywie
 Legarda
 Leśniewice
 Lipa
 Lisica
 Łokietnica
 Lucień
 Marianka
 Marianów
 Marianów Sierakowski
 Mysłownia Nowa
 Nagodów
 Niecki
 Nowa Huta
 Nowa Jastrzębia
 Nowa Wieś
 Nowy Zaborów
 Osada
 Osiny
 Podgórze
 Pomorzanki
 Rębów
 Rogożewek
 Rumunki
 Ruszków
 Rybne
 Sałki
 Sieraków
 Sierakówek
 Skrzany
 Sokołów
 Solec
 Stanisławów
 Stanisławów Skrzański
 Stary Zaborów
 Stefanów
 Strzałki
 Wrząca
 Zieleniec
 Zuzinów and Zwoleń

Neighbouring gminas
Gmina Gostynin is bordered by the town of Gostynin and by the gminas of Baruchowo, Łąck, Łanięta, Lubień Kujawski, Nowy Duninów, Strzelce and Szczawin Kościelny.

References
Polish official population figures 2006

External links 

Gostynin
Gostynin County